Romelia Lichtenstein, also Romelia Assenowa-Lichtenstein (12 March 1962 in Sofia) is a German opera, operetta, oratorio, lied and concert soprano. After an apprenticeship as children's nurse she studied vocals at the University of Music and Theatre Leipzig. In June 2012 she was appointed Kammersängerin by the city of Halle.

Awards 
 1990: First prize in the Young Opera Singers competition
 1998: best opera singer by magazine Opernwelt
 2016: Handel Prize der Stadt Halle an der Saale.

Discography 
 Georg Friedrich Händel, Admeto, 2 DVDs + 2 CDs, Arthaus Musik
 Karl Ditters von Dittersdorf, Giob (Oratorium), CD, cpo
 Engelbert Humperdinck, Hänsel und Gretel, DVD, NCA*

References

External links 
 Romelia Lichtenstein on Operissimo
 
 Bühnen Halle – Theater, Oper und Orchester Halle GmbH
 Feuilleton: Romelia Lichtenstein im Interview / Online Musik Magazin
 
 

1962 births
Living people
Musicians from Sofia
German operatic sopranos
Handel Prize winners
Bulgarian emigrants to Germany